Jean Charles Rodolphe Radau (22 January 1835 – 21 December 1911) was an astronomer and mathematician who worked in Paris at the Revue des deux Mondes for most of his life. He was the co-founder of the Bulletin Astronomique.

Radau was born in Angerburg, Province of Prussia (now Węgorzewo in Poland), and after studying in Königsberg and working on the Three-body problem, he moved to Paris to collaborate with other scientists. In 1871 he was given the Ph.D. in honor of his work in mathematics. 

Radau won the Prix Damoiseau of the French Academy of Sciences in 1892 working on planetary perturbations in the motion of the Moon. This work was of such a high quality that he was elected to the Academy in 1897.

A crater on Mars is named in Radau's honor.

His publications include the Wonders of Acoustics (1867).

See also
Darwin–Radau equation

External links

Obituaries
AN 190(1912) 251 
MNRAS 72(1912) 259

1835 births
1911 deaths
People from Węgorzewo
19th-century German astronomers
19th-century German mathematicians
People from the Province of Prussia
Members of the French Academy of Sciences
Recipients of the Lalande Prize
20th-century German mathematicians